Nadihal is a village located in the north of the Indian union territory of Jammu and Kashmir. It is just 4 km away from Bandipora town, and 51 km away from Srinagar. It the largest village in Bandipora district. There are many small villages around it. It is a prosperous and modern village with a population of 5167 (as per 2011 official census) . Nadihal is inhabited by only Muslims. In this village, there are two government middle schools, one higher secondary school, and two high schools. Besides Government-run schools, there are a few private schools and a Public Institute Popularly known as Radiant Public Secondary School as well in this village.  The level of education in Nadihal is moderate but has significantly increased in recent times. 

The main occupations of the people include agriculture, trade and services.

Nadihal has a government dispensary, a panchayat ghar, A Panchayat Bhawan, and a recently allocated ISM (Indian System of Medicine) hospital. Nadihal has several sweet water springs. The famous one is located near Dispensary. There are also two bank branches: Grameen Bank and recently established J&K Bank branch (inaugurated 2017).Besides Nadihal has a common services centre popularly Known as Khidmat Centre (J&K Bank Franchise) that caters the needs of IT Services, internet services, air ticket facilities, G2C Services, B2C Services, door step banking facilities to almost 5-6 nearby villages.

In Nadihal, there are 8 mosques, a Jamia mosque and an Eid Gah. The main Jamia Masjid called "Markazi Jamia Masjid Nadihal" run by local Auqaf committee (that consists of people from all walks of life, to give due representation all al mosques) is located near the main bus stop. It is beautifully decorated and has almost 4 storeys.

Nadihal market consists of almost 250 shops selling daily consumables including groceries, vegetables and fruits, medicine, timber, steel, iron. The Nadihal market is now so well established that you can find everything in the market from the Roofings to tiles to medicines etc.

In common with other parts of the district, Nadihal village is also well known for its scenic beauty, and plentiful availability of water. It is located on the banks of world-famous Wular Lake. A beautiful panoramic view of the village can be seen from a nearby resort Wular Vintage Park. One can also have a scintillating view of the picturesque Harmukh mountains in the background.

References

External links
 

Villages in Bandipora district